Kuntur Wasi (Quechua for "condor house", Hispanicized spellings Condor Huasi, Cóndor Huasi, Condorhuasi) may refer to:

 Cóndor Huasi, a village and municipality in Argentina
 Kuntur Wasi, an archaeological site in the Cajamarca Region, Peru
 Kuntur Wasi (Ancash), a mountain in the Ancash Region, Peru
 Kuntur Wasi (Bolivia), a mountain in the Potosí Department, Bolivia
 Kuntur Wasi (Peru), a mountain in the Apurímac Region, Peru

See also 
 Kuntur Wayi (disambiguation)